Donald Gene Shroyer (November 24, 1925 – July 7, 2013) was an American football and baseball coach.  He served as the head football coach at Millikin University in Decatur, Illinois from 1956 to 1961 and at Southern Illinois University Carbondale from 1964 to 1965, compiling a career college football coaching record of 32–35–1.  Shroyer was also the head baseball coach at Millikin from 1957 to 1959, tallying a mark of 28–15.  From 1962 to 1963, he was an assistant coach for St. Louis Cardinals of the National Football League (NFL).

Playing career
As a player at Millikin University, Shroyer was all-conference halfback in football for three consecutive years and all-conference champion in track in the broad jump.

Coaching career

Millikin
After a brief stint in the high school ranks, Shoyer returned to his alma mater, Millikin University, for his first college head coaching job and led the team from 1956 until 1961, accumulating a record of 28–19–1 with an undefeated season in 1961.

Southern Illinois
After Millikin, Shoyer became the tenth head football coach at Southern Illinois University Carbondale and he held that position for two seasons, from 1964 until 1965.  His record at Southern Illinois was 4–16.

Head coaching record

College football

References

External links
 

1925 births
2013 deaths
American football halfbacks
American male long jumpers
Millikin Big Blue baseball coaches
Millikin Big Blue football coaches
Millikin Big Blue football players
Southern Illinois Salukis football coaches
St. Louis Cardinals (football) coaches
College men's track and field athletes in the United States
High school football coaches in Illinois
People from Moultrie County, Illinois
Players of American football from Illinois